The Little Tough Guys (later billed as 'The Dead End Kids and Little Tough Guys') were a group of actors who made a series of films and serials released by Universal Studios from 1938 through 1943.  Many of them were originally part of The Dead End Kids, and several of them later became members of The East Side Kids and The Bowery Boys.

History

The urban drama Dead End became both a successful play and a hit movie, featuring six young actors playing streetwise guttersnipes: Billy Halop, Leo Gorcey, Huntz Hall, Gabriel Dell, Bobby Jordan, and Bernard Punsly. The troupe became known as The Dead End Kids and starred in a series of features for Warner Brothers.

Little Tough Guys
In 1938, Universal borrowed the Dead End Kids (except Gorcey and Jordan) for a juvenile-delinquency drama called Little Tough Guy. Universal adopted this as a brand name, and turned the film into a series of 'Little Tough Guys' features. The studio filled out the cast with David Gorcey (Leo's younger brother) and Hally Chester.

The next three films did not include any of the original Dead End Kids. Little Tough Guys in Society (1939) was more of a lightweight comedy, while the next two, Newsboys' Home and Code of the Streets (1939), were more dramatic. Jackie Cooper starred in Newsboys' Home, but was not a member of the team. Only David Gorcey and Hally Chester remained from the first film, Little Tough Guy. This was the beginning of the members of the team changing on almost a film-to-film basis. Eleven actors drifted in and out of the series, including Frankie Thomas, Charles Duncan (who was originally hired to play Leo Gorcey's role in the play Dead End), and Billy Benedict.

When Warners released Bobby Jordan from his contract, Universal quickly signed him to join the rest of gang. Now, with five of the original six Dead End Kids on the payroll, Universal revised the billing to read "The Dead End Kids and Little Tough Guys". In total, the Little Tough Guys made 12 feature films, and three 12-chapter serials. Leading player Halop joined the armed forces and was replaced by Jordan for the final film in the series, Keep 'Em Slugging, released in 1943.

Shemp Howard of the Three Stooges appeared in Give Us Wings, Hit the Road and Keep 'Em Slugging. Huntz Hall cited Howard as a major influence when his later "Bowery Boys" series shifted to all-out slapstick comedy.

There was still a market for these tough-teen films, and most of the Little Tough Guys principals wound up at Monogram Pictures as The East Side Kids and The Bowery Boys.

List of Dead End Kids and Little Tough Guys
 Billy Halop as Johnny/Jimmy/Tom/Tommy/Billy/Ace (1938-1943)
 Huntz Hall as Pig/Gyp/Toby/Bolts (1938-1943)
 Gabriel Dell as String/Terry/Bilge/Stick (1938, 1940-1943)
 Bernard Punsly as Ape/Lug/Butch/Greaseball (1938, 1940-1943)
 Bobby Jordan as Rap/Tommy (1940, 1943)
 David Gorcey as Sniper/Yap/Double Face Gordon (1938-1940, 1942)
 Hally Chester as Dopey/Murph/Trust/Swab (1938-1941)
 Frankie Thomas as Danny/Bob (1938-1939)
 Harris Berger as Sailor/Bud/Charlie (1938-1941)
 Charles Duncan as Monk (1938-1939)
 William Benedict as Trouble/Link/Whitey (1938-1940, 1942)
 James McCallion as Danny (1939)
 Kenneth Lundy as Buck (1940)
 Norman Abbott as Ape (1943)

Filmography

See also
Dead End Kids
East Side Kids
The Bowery Boys

References

External links

Film series introduced in 1938
American male child actors
American male comedians
American comedians
American film series
American male film actors